San Jose Adventist Academy Inc. (SJAA) is a private non-sectarian institution in San Jose, Occidental Mindoro, Philippines. It was founded in 1996 under the Adventist Education. Also its partner school, The San Jose Adventist Elementary School (SJAES), formerly known as San Jose Adventist School (SJAS).
It is part of the Seventh-day Adventist Church's worldwide educational system. All students are called "Academians".

Spiritual aspects
All students take religion classes each year that they are enrolled. These classes cover topics in biblical history and Christian and denominational doctrines. Instructors in other disciplines also begin each class period with prayer or a short devotional thought, many which encourage student input. Weekly, the entire student body gathers together for an hour-long chapel service.
Outside the classrooms there is year-round spiritually oriented programming that relies on student involvement. Every Friday afternoon, no classes can be attended for the preparation of the sabbath day.

Activities
Every year, the academy's Pathfinder Club host a Pathfinder camping outside the campus. The camporee lasts 4 days with several activities like camp cookery, obstacle race, hiking, treasure hunting, swimming lesson, etc. that engages the preparation on God's second coming. The said Pathfinder camping is exclusive for Grades 7-8 and 9 (optional for Grade 9). Also the Citizenship Advancement Training Officers and Trainees. The camping includes the Sabbath day that all campers we're having a worship service on the camp and a potluck.

Athletics
The school offers the following  sports:
Basketball
Volleyball
Table Tennis
Sepak Takraw
Badminton

See also

 List of Seventh-day Adventist secondary and elementary schools
 Seventh-day Adventist education
 Seventh-day Adventist Church
 Seventh-day Adventist theology
 History of the Seventh-day Adventist Church

References

External links

Adventist secondary schools in the Philippines
Schools in Occidental Mindoro